Disinformation is false information deliberately spread to deceive people. It is sometimes confused with misinformation, which is false information but is not deliberate.

The English word disinformation comes from the application of the Latin prefix dis- to information making the meaning "reversal or removal of information". The rarely used word had appeared with this usage in print at least as far back as 1887. Some consider it a loan translation of the Russian dezinformatsiya, derived from the title of a KGB black propaganda department. Defector Ion Mihai Pacepa claimed Joseph Stalin coined the term, giving it a French-sounding name to claim it had a Western origin. Russian use began with a "special disinformation office" in 1923.  Disinformation was defined in Great Soviet Encyclopedia (1952) as "false information with the intention to deceive public opinion". Operation INFEKTION was a Soviet disinformation campaign to influence opinion that the U.S. invented AIDS. The U.S. did not actively counter disinformation until 1980, when a fake document reported that the U.S. supported apartheid.

Etymology and early usage

the press, on the radio, etc.) of false reports intended to mislead public opinion.” In order to distinguish between similar terms, including misinformation and malinformation, scholars collectively agree on the definitions for each term as follows: (1) disinformation is the strategic dissemination of false information with the intention to cause public harm; (2)  misinformation represents the unintentional spread of false information; and (3) malinformation is factual information disseminated with the intention to cause harm, these terms are abbreviated 'DMMI'. 

Where misinformation refers to inaccuracies that stem from error, disinformation is a deliberate falsehood promulgated by design. Misinformation can be used to create disinformation when known misinformation is purposefully and intentionally disseminated. 
The tactic has been used throughout history, being deployed during the long Roman-Persian Wars, at the Battle of Mount Gindarus, the Battle of Telephis–Ollaria, and Heraclius assault on Persia, for instance.

Disinformation is the label often given to Foreign information manipulation and interference (FIMI). Studies on disinformation are often concerned with the content of activity whereas the broader concept of FIMI is more concerned with the “behaviour of an actor” that is described through the military doctrine concept of tactics, techniques, and procedures (TTPs).

Disinformation is primarily carried out by government intelligence agencies, but has also been used by non-governmental organizations and businesses. Front groups are a form of disinformation, as they mislead the public about their true objectives and who their controllers are. Most recently, disinformation has been deliberately spread through social media in the form of "fake news", disinformation masked as legitimate news articles and meant to mislead readers or viewers. Disinformation may include distribution of forged documents, manuscripts, and photographs, or spreading dangerous rumours and fabricated intelligence. Use of these tactics can lead to blowback, however, causing such unintended consequences such as defamation lawsuits or damage to the dis-informer's reputation.

Use of the term related to a Russian tactical weapon started in 1923, when the deputy chairman of the KGB-precursor the State Political Directorate (GPU), Józef Unszlicht, called for the foundation of "a special disinformation office to conduct active intelligence operations". The GPU was the first organization in the Soviet Union to use the term disinformation for their intelligence tactics. William Safire wrote in his 1993 book, Quoth the Maven, that disinformation was used by the KGB predecessor to indicate: "manipulation of a nation's intelligence system through the injection of credible, but misleading data". From this point on, disinformation became a tactic used in the Soviet political warfare called active measures. Active measures were a crucial part of Soviet intelligence strategy involving forgery as covert operation, subversion, and media manipulation. The term was used in 1939, related to a "German Disinformation Service". The 1991 edition of The Merriam-Webster New Book of Word Histories defines disinformation as a probable translation of the Russian . This dictionary notes that it was possible the English version of the word and the Russian-language version developed independently in parallel to each other—out of ongoing frustration related to the spread of propaganda before World War II.

Ion Mihai Pacepa, former senior official from the Romanian secret police, said the word was coined by Joseph Stalin and used during World War II. The Stalinist government then used disinformation tactics in both World War II and the Cold War. Soviet intelligence used the term maskirovka (Russian military deception) to refer to a combination of tactics including disinformation, simulation, camouflage, and concealment. Pacepa and Ronald J. Rychlak authored a book entitled Disinformation, in which Pacepa wrote that Stalin gave the tactic a French-sounding title in order to put forth the ruse that it was a technique used by the Western world. Pacepa recounted reading Soviet instruction manuals while working as an intelligence officer, that characterized disinformation as a strategy used by the Russian government that had early origins in Russian history. Pacepa recalled that the Soviet manuals said the origins of disinformation stemmed from phony towns constructed by Grigory Potyomkin in Crimea to wow Catherine the Great during her 1783 journey to the region—subsequently referred to as Potemkin villages.

The black propaganda division was reported to have formed in 1955 and was referred to as the Dezinformatsiya agency. Former Central Intelligence Agency (CIA) director William Colby explained how the Dezinformatsiya agency operated, saying that it would place a false article in a left-leaning newspaper. The fraudulent tale would make its way to a communist periodical, before eventually being published by a Soviet newspaper, which would say its sources were undisclosed individuals. By this process a falsehood was globally proliferated as a legitimate piece of reporting.

According to Oxford Dictionaries the English word disinformation, as translated from the Russian , began to see use in the 1950s. The term disinformation began to see wider use as a form of Soviet tradecraft, defined in the 1952 official Great Soviet Encyclopedia as "the dissemination (in the press, radio, etc.) of false information with the intention to deceive public opinion." During the most-active period of the Cold War, from 1945 to 1989, the tactic was used by multiple intelligence agencies including the Soviet KGB, British Secret Intelligence Service, and the American CIA. The word disinformation saw increased usage in the 1960s and wider purveyance by the 1980s. A major disinformation effort in 1964, Operation Neptune, was designed by the Czechoslovak secret service, the StB, to defame West European politicians as former Nazi collaborators. Former Soviet bloc intelligence officer Ladislav Bittman, the first disinformation practitioner to publicly defect to the West, described the official definition as different from the practice: "The interpretation is slightly distorted because public opinion is only one of the potential targets. Many disinformation games are designed only to manipulate the decision-making elite, and receive no publicity." Bittman was deputy chief of the Disinformation Department of the Czechoslovak Intelligence Service, and testified before the United States Congress on his knowledge of disinformation in 1980.

Defections reveal covert operations

The extent of Soviet disinformation covert operation campaigns came to light through the defections of KGB officers and officers of allied Soviet bloc services from the late 1960s to the 1980s. Stanislav Levchenko and Ilya Dzerkvilov were among the Soviet defectors. By 1990, both men had written books recounting their work on disinformation operations for the KGB. Archival documentation revealed in the disorder of the fall of the Soviet Union later confirmed their testimonials.

An early example of successful Soviet disinformation was the 1961 pamphlet, A Study of a Master Spy (Allen Dulles). It was published in the United Kingdom and was highly critical of U.S. CIA director Allen Dulles. The purported authors were given as Independent Labour Party Member of Parliament Bob Edwards and the reporter Kenneth Dunne, but the real author was senior disinformation officer KGB Colonel Vassily Sitnikov. in 1968, the fake Who's Who in the CIA was published, which was quoted as authoritative in the West until the early 1990s.

According to American journalist Max Holland, Soviet archives, particularly those released by Vasili Mitrokhin, "prove that the KGB played a central, pernicious role in fomenting the belief that the CIA was involved in Kennedy's assassination." Among other incidents, Holland stated that the KGB planted a false story in the Italian newspaper Paese Sera alleging that Clay Shaw, whom New Orleans district attorney Jim Garrison indicted in connection with the assassination, was a high-level "CIA operative". The KGB disinformation influenced Garrison's subsequent arguments during the trial of Clay Shaw and was later referenced in Oliver Stone's 1991 film JFK, notwithstanding Shaw's acquittal. Holland writes that "Arguably, [JFK] is the only American feature film made during the Cold War to have, as its very axis, a lie concocted in the KGB's disinformation factories."

According to senior SVR officer Sergei Tretyakov, the KGB had been responsible for creating the entire nuclear winter story as an attempt to stop the deployment of Pershing II missiles. Tretyakov said that in 1979, the KGB started work to prevent the United States from deploying the missiles in Western Europe and that they had been directed by Yuri Andropov to distribute disinformation, based on a faked "doomsday report" by the Soviet Academy of Sciences. The report contained false information on the effect of nuclear war on climate, and was distributed to peace groups, environmentalists, and the journal Ambio: A Journal of the Human Environment.

During the 1970s, the U.S. intelligence apparatus made little effort to counter Soviet disinformation campaigns. That posture changed during the Carter administration, however, after the White House had been made the subject of a propaganda operation by Soviet intelligence to affect international relations between the U.S. and South Africa. On 17 September 1980, White House Press Secretary Jody Powell acknowledged that a falsified Presidential Review Memorandum on Africa falsely stated that the U.S. had endorsed the apartheid government in South Africa and was actively committed to discrimination against African Americans. Prior to the revelation by Powell, an advance copy of the 18 September 1980 issue of San Francisco-based publication the Sun Reporter had been disseminated, which carried the fake claims. Sun Reporter was published by Carlton Benjamin Goodlett, a Presidential Committee member of a Soviet front group, the World Peace Council. U.S. President Jimmy Carter was appalled at the lies, and his administration then displayed increased interest in the CIA's efforts to counter Soviet disinformation.

In 1982, the CIA issued a report on active measures used by Soviet intelligence. The report documented numerous instances of disinformation campaigns against the U.S., including planting a notion that it had organized the 1979 Grand Mosque seizure, as well as forgery of documents purporting to show the U.S. would use nuclear bombs on its NATO allies.

In 1985, the Soviets launched an elaborate disinformation campaign called Operation INFEKTION to influence global opinion that the U.S. had invented AIDS. The campaign included allegations that the disease had been created as an "ethnic weapon" to destroy non-whites. The head of Russian foreign intelligence, Yevgeny Primakov, admitted the existence of the Operation INFEKTION in 1992.

In 1985, Aldrich Ames gave the KGB a significant amount of information on CIA informants, and the Soviet government swiftly moved to arrest those individuals. Soviet intelligence feared that the rapid action would alert the CIA that Ames was a spy, however. To conceal Ames's duplicity from the CIA, the KGB manufactured disinformation as to the reasoning behind the arrests of the intelligence agents. In the summer of 1985, a KGB officer who was a double agent working for the CIA on a mission in Africa traveled to a dead drop in Moscow on his way home, but never reported in. The CIA heard from a European KGB source that its agent had been arrested. Simultaneously, the FBI and CIA learned from a second KGB source of its agent's arrest. Only after Ames had been outed as a spy for the KGB would it become apparent that the KGB had known all along that both men had been working for the U.S. government, and that Soviet disinformation had been successful in confounding the American intelligence agency.

Disinformation and propaganda
Whether and to what degree these terms overlap is subject to debate. Some (like U.S. Department of State) define propaganda as the use of non-rational arguments to either advance or undermine a political ideal, and use disinformation as an alternative name for undermining propaganda. While others consider them to be separate concepts altogether. One popular distinction holds that disinformation also describes politically motivated messaging designed explicitly to engender public cynicism, uncertainty, apathy, distrust, and paranoia, all of which disincentivize citizen engagement and mobilization for social or political change.

Russian disinformation in the post-Soviet era

During the Cold War, the Soviet Union used propaganda and disinformation as part of its "active measures...against the populations of Western nations"." During the administration of Boris Yeltsin, the first President of Russia after the collapse of the Soviet Union, "disinformation" was discussed in the Russian media and by Russian politicians in relation to the disinformation of the Soviet era, and to differentiate Boris Yeltsin's "new Russia" from its Soviet predecessor. However, in the post-Soviet era, disinformation evolved to become a key tactic in the military doctrine of Russia. Its use has increased under the leadership of Vladimir Putin, particularly after the 2008 Russian invasion of Georgia. This style of disinformation propaganda has been described as a "firehose of falsehood" by observers due to its high number of channels and willingness to disseminate outright falsehoods, to the point of inconsistency. It differs from Soviet-era disinformation tactics in its use of the internet, claimed amateur journalism, and social media.

The European Union and NATO saw Russian disinformation in the early twenty-first century as such a problem that both set up special units to analyze and debunk fabricated falsehoods. NATO founded a modest facility in Latvia to respond to disinformation  and agreement by heads of state and governments in March 2015 let the EU create the European External Action Service East Stratcom Task Force, which publishes weekly reports on its website "EU vs Disinfo." The website and its partners identified and debunked more than 3,500 pro-Kremlin disinformation cases between September 2015 and November 2017.

Russia meanwhile used its television outlet RT (formerly known as Russia Today) and the Sputnik news agency. When explaining the 2016 annual report of the Swedish Security Service on disinformation, the representative Wilhelm Unge stated: "We mean everything from Internet trolls to propaganda and misinformation spread by media companies like RT and Sputnik." RT and Sputnik were created to focus on Western audiences and function by Western standards, and RT tends to focus on how problems are the fault of Western countries.

Social media platforms and the internet
In the 2010s, as social media gained prominence, Russia then began to use platforms such as Facebook, Twitter, and YouTube to spread disinformation. Russian web brigades and bots, typically operated by Russia's Internet Research Agency (IRA), were commonly used to disseminate disinformation throughout these social media channels. As of late 2017, Facebook believed that as many as 126 million of its users had seen content from Russian disinformation campaigns on its platform. Twitter stated that it had found 36,000 Russian bots spreading tweets related to the 2016 U.S. elections. Elsewhere, Russia has used social media to destabilize former Soviet states such as Ukraine and Western nations such as France and Spain.

In 2020, the US State Department identified several "proxy sites" used by Russian state actors "to create and amplify false narratives." These sites include the Strategic Culture Foundation,  online journal the New Eastern Outlook, Crimea-based news agency NewsFront, and SouthFront, a website targeted at "military enthusiasts, veterans, and conspiracy theorists."

Internet Research Agency

In the runup to and during the 2020 U.S. presidential election, Russia's Internet Research Agency (IRA) demonstrated evolved tactics for spreading disinformation. Probably to evade the detection mechanisms of social media platforms, the IRA co-opted activists working for a human-rights focused Ghanaian NGO to target black communities in the U.S. Russian campaigns have also evolved to become more cross-platform, with content spreading, not only on Facebook and Twitter, but also on Tumblr, Wordpress, and Medium. The IRA is also more emboldened, with evidence that they recruited U.S. journalists to write articles critical of U.S. presidential candidate Joe Biden.

Russian Institute for Strategic Studies

During both the 2016 and the 2020 elections, the Russian Institute for Strategic Studies (RISS) was integral to disinformation efforts from Putin and the Kremlin. Leonid Petrovich Reshetnikov headed RISS in 2016, while Mikhail Fradkov headed it in 2020. During the 2016 U.S. presidential election, George Papadopoulos met several times with Panos Kammenos, who had numerous close ties to Russian intelligence, Vladimir Putin, and the Kremlin group tasked with interfering in the 2016 U.S. elections. Kammenos formed the Athens-based Institute of Geopolitical Studies which in November 2014 signed a "memorandum of understanding" with the former SVR officer Reshetnikov who headed RISS. In 2009, RISS, which had been an SVR operation, was placed under control of the Russian president with Reshetnikov regularly meeting with Putin and participated in Russian interference in the 2016 U.S. elections by developing plans of action; with Russian intelligence assets and using a large disinformation campaign, Putin would support Republicans and Donald Trump's campaign, and disrupt Democrats and Hillary Clinton's campaign, and if Trump were likely to lose the election, then Russia would shift its efforts to focus upon voter fraud in the U.S. in order to undermine the legitimacy of its electoral system and elections. Kammenos' positions followed closely with the Kremlin's talking points.

During the 2020 U.S. presidential election campaign, Russia's numerous disinformation attacks including support for white supremacist activities and attacks of Democratic presidential candidate Joe Biden's mental fitness were utilized by Trump, senior Trump Administration officials, and his re-election campaign. Brian Murphy, who was acting chief of intelligence at the Department of Homeland Security from March 2018 until August 2020, alleged that he was instructed "to cease providing intelligence assessments on the threat of Russian interference in the United States, and instead start reporting on interference activities by China and Iran." Chad Wolf, who was acting secretary of the Department of Homeland Security, alleged that Robert C. O'Brien, who was Trump's national security advisor, had the assessments of Russian interference suppressed. John Cohen, who was under secretary of intelligence at the Department of Homeland Security during Barack Obama's presidency, stated: "By blocking information from being released that describes threats facing the nation... undermines the ability of the public and state and local authorities to work with the federal government to counteract the threat."

Lev Parnas, Igor Fruman, Yuriy Lutsenko, John Solomon, Dmytro Firtash, and his allies Victoria Toensing and Joe diGenova were noted in a Fox News internal report Ukraine, Disinformation, & the Trump Administration: a Full Timeline of Events, which was written by Fox News senior political affairs specialist Bryan S. Murphy and made public by Marcus DiPaola, as indispensable "in the collection and domestic publication of elements of this disinformation campaign" and numerous falsehoods. Sean Hannity, Laura Ingraham, Lou Dobbs, and Pete Sessions, who is the son of William S. Sessions, the former FBI director under Presidents Ronald Reagan and George H. W. Bush, were supportive of disinformation efforts. In September 2020, two supervisors and a quarter of the persons with Fox News Brain Room, which was established by Roger Ailes as a fact-checking and research unit, received layoffs allegedly ordered by Joe Dorrego and organized by Porter Berry and Stefanie Wheeler Choi in order to have Fox News support Trump's information campaign; according to a Brain Room employee, "the Brain Room, in their research, came up with facts that were not used in Fox reports or were in contradiction to what Fox aired. I have to imagine that kind of tension has always existed there, between the fact-checkers and what is often reported."

In March 2021, Christopher A. Wray, who was the Director of the FBI during most of Trump's presidency, and the National Intelligence Council stated that numerous Russians, other individuals, proxies, and entitites, including Rudy Giuliani, Fox News, the One America News Network, the documentary film The Ukraine Hoax: Impeachment, Biden Cash, and Mass Murder that was created with support from Konstantin Kilimnik, Andrii Derkach, Andrii Telizhenko, Sergey Petrushin, and Michael Caputo, and aired on 21 January 2022, two weeks before the Senate's acquittal of Trump after his first impeachment trial, supported anti-Biden, anti-Ukraine, pro-Trump, pro-Russia, pro-Kremlin, and pro-Putin disinformation efforts during the Trump presidency, including Trump's two impeachment trials and his two presidential campaigns.

Russo-Ukrainian War 

Modern Russian propaganda is different from classic Soviet Cold War techniques, relying on obfuscation and using the contemporary information environment with all the channels available to it, including the Internet, social media, professional and amateur journalism, and media outlets. They use numerous channels and messages, in order to confuse and overwhelm the audience. A RAND report labeled the Russian propaganda model as a "firehose of falsehood".

Russian disinformation has been used in the Russo-Ukrainian War. In March 2022 during the Russian invasion, ProPublica reported what may be the first case of a disinformation false-flag operation. Videos were discovered purporting to show Ukrainian-produced disinformation about strikes inside Ukraine which were then "debunked" as some other event outside Ukraine. However, the original supposed "Ukraine-produced" disinformation was never disseminated by anyone, and was in fact preventive disinformation created in order to be debunked and cause confusion and mitigate the impact on the Russian public of real footage of Russian strikes within Ukraine when it eventually got past Russian-controlled media. According to Patrick Warren, head of Clemson's Media Forensics Hub, "It's like Russians actually pretending to be Ukrainians spreading disinformation. ... The reason that it’s so effective is because you don’t actually have to convince someone that it's true. It’s sufficient to make people uncertain as to what they should trust."

English language spread

The United States Intelligence Community appropriated use of the term disinformation in the 1950s from the Russian dezinformatsiya, and began to use similar strategies  during the Cold War and in conflict with other nations. The New York Times reported in 2000 that during the CIA's effort to substitute Mohammed Reza Pahlavi for then-Prime Minister of Iran Mohammad Mossadegh, the CIA placed fictitious stories in the local newspaper. Reuters documented how, subsequent to the 1979 Soviet Union invasion of Afghanistan during the Soviet–Afghan War, the CIA put false articles in newspapers of Islamic-majority countries, inaccurately stating that Soviet embassies had "invasion day celebrations". Reuters noted a former U.S. intelligence officer said they would attempt to gain the confidence of reporters and use them as secret agents, to affect a nation's politics by way of their local media.

In October 1986, the term gained increased currency in the U.S. when it was revealed that two months previously, the Reagan Administration had engaged in a disinformation campaign against then-leader of Libya, Muammar Gaddafi. White House representative Larry Speakes said reports of a planned attack on Libya as first broken by The Wall Street Journal on August 25, 1986, were "authoritative", and other newspapers including The Washington Post then wrote articles saying this was factual. U.S. State Department representative Bernard Kalb resigned from his position in protest over the disinformation campaign, and said: "Faith in the word of America is the pulse beat of our democracy."

The executive branch of the Reagan administration kept watch on disinformation campaigns through three yearly publications by the Department of State: Active Measures: A Report on the Substance and Process of Anti-U.S. Disinformation and Propaganda Campaigns (1986); Report on Active Measures and Propaganda, 1986–87 (1987); and Report on Active Measures and Propaganda, 1987–88 (1989).

Disinformation first made an appearance in dictionaries in 1985, specifically, Webster's New College Dictionary and the American Heritage Dictionary. In 1986, the term disinformation was not defined in Webster's New World Thesaurus or New Encyclopædia Britannica. After the Soviet term became widely known in the 1980s, native speakers of English broadened the term as "any government communication (either overt or covert) containing intentionally false and misleading material, often combined selectively with true information, which seeks to mislead and manipulate either elites or a mass audience."

By 1990, use of the term disinformation had fully established itself in the English language within the lexicon of politics. By 2001, the term disinformation had come to be known as simply a more civil phrase for saying someone was lying. Stanley B. Cunningham wrote in his 2002 book The Idea of Propaganda that disinformation had become pervasively used as a synonym for propaganda.

Responses from cultural leaders 
Pope Francis condemned disinformation in a 2016 interview, after being made the subject of a fake news website during the 2016 U.S. election cycle which falsely claimed that he supported Donald Trump. He said the worst thing the news media could do was spread disinformation. He said the act was a sin, comparing those who spread disinformation to individuals who engage in coprophilia.

Ethics in warfare 
In a contribution to the 2014 book Military Ethics and Emerging Technologies, writers David Danks and Joseph H. Danks discuss the ethical implications in using disinformation as a tactic during information warfare. They note there has been a significant degree of philosophical debate over the issue as related to the ethics of war and use of the technique. The writers describe a position whereby the use of disinformation is occasionally allowed, but not in all situations. Typically the ethical test to consider is whether the disinformation was performed out of a motivation of good faith and acceptable according to the rules of war. By this test, the tactic during World War II of putting fake inflatable tanks in visible locations on the Pacific Islands in order to falsely present the impression that there were larger military forces present would be considered as ethically permissible. Conversely, disguising a munitions plant as a healthcare facility in order to avoid attack would be outside the bounds of acceptable use of disinformation during war.

Research 

Research related to disinformation studies is increasing as an applied area of inquiry. The call to formally classify disinformation as a cybersecurity threat is made by advocates due to its increase in social networking sites. Researchers working for the University of Oxford found that over a three-year period the number of governments engaging in online disinformation rose from 28 in 2017, to 40 in 2018, and 70 in 2019. Despite the proliferation of social media websites, Facebook and Twitter showed the most activity in terms of active disinformation campaigns. Techniques reported on included the use of bots to amplify hate speech, the illegal harvesting of data, and paid trolls to harass and threaten journalists.

Whereas disinformation research focuses primarily on how actors orchestrate deceptions on social media, primarily via fake news, new research investigates how people take what started as deceptions and circulate them as their personal views. As a result, research shows that disinformation can be conceptualized as a program that encourages engagement in oppositional fantasies (i.e., culture wars), through which disinformation circulates as rhetorical ammunition for never-ending arguments. As disinformation entangles with culture wars, identity-driven controversies constitute a vehicle through which disinformation disseminates on social media. This means that disinformation thrives, not despite raucous grudges but because of them. The reason is that controversies provide fertile ground for never-ending debates that solidify points of view.

Scholars have pointed out that disinformation is not only a foreign threat as domestic purveyors of disinformation are also leveraging traditional media outlets such as newspapers, radio stations, and television news media to disseminate false information. Current research suggests right-wing online political activists in the United States may be more likely to use disinformation as a strategy and tactic. Governments have responded with a wide range of policies to address concerns about the potential threats that disinformation poses to democracy, however, there is little agreement in elite policy discourse or academic literature as to what it means for disinformation to threaten democracy, and how different policies might help to counter its negative implications.

Consequences of exposure to disinformation online 
There is a broad consensus amongst scholars that there is a high degree of disinformation, misinformation, and propaganda online; however, it is unclear to what extent such disinformation has on political attitudes in the public and, therefore, political outcomes. This conventional wisdom has come mostly from investigative journalists, with a particular rise during the 2016 U.S. election: some of the earliest work came from Craig Silverman at Buzzfeed News. Cass Sunstein supported this in #Republic, arguing that the internet would become rife with echo chambers and informational cascades of misinformation leading to a highly polarized and ill-informed society.

Research after the 2016 election found:  (1) for 14 percent of Americans social media was their “most important” source of election news; 2) known false news stories “favoring Trump were shared a total of 30 million times on Facebook, while those favoring Clinton were shared 8 million times”; 3) the average American adult saw fake news stories, “with just over half of those who recalled seeing them believing them”; and 4) people are more likely to “believe stories that favor their preferred candidate, especially if they have ideologically segregated social media networks.”  Correspondingly, whilst there is wide agreement that the digital spread  and uptake of disinformation during the 2016 election was massive and very likely facilitated by foreign agents, there is an ongoing debate on whether all this had any actual effect on the election. For example, a double blind randomized-control experiment by researchers from the London School of Economics (LSE), found that exposure to online fake news about either Trump or Clinton had no significant effect on intentions to vote for those candidates. Researchers who examined the influence of Russian disinformation on Twitter during the 2016 US presidential campaign found that exposure to disinformation was (1) concentrated among a tiny group of users, (2) primarily among Republicans, and (3) eclipsed by exposure to legitimate political news media and politicians. Finally, they find "no evidence of a meaningful relationship between exposure to the Russian foreign influence campaign and changes in attitudes, polarization, or voting behavior." As such, despite its mass dissemination during the 2016 Presidential Elections, online fake news or disinformation probably did not cost Hillary Clinton the votes needed to secure the presidency.  

Research on this topic is continuing, and some evidence is less clear. For example, internet access and time spent on social media does not appear correlated with polarisation. Further, misinformation appears not to significantly change political knowledge of those exposed to it. There seems to be a higher level of diversity of news sources that users are exposed to on Facebook and Twitter than conventional wisdom would dictate, as well as a higher frequency of cross-spectrum discussion. Other evidence has found that disinformation campaigns rarely succeed in altering the foreign policies of the targeted states.

Research is also challenging because disinformation is meant to be difficult to  detect and some social media companies have discouraged outside research efforts.  For example, researchers found disinformation made “existing detection algorithms from traditional news media ineffective or not applicable...[because disinformation] is intentionally written to mislead readers...[and] users' social engagements with fake news produce data that is big, incomplete, unstructured, and noisy.”  Facebook, the largest social media company, has been criticized by analytical journalists and scholars for preventing outside research of disinformation.

Strategies for spreading disinformation 

The research literature on how disinformation spreads is growing. Studies show that disinformation spread in social media can be classified into two broad stages: seeding and echoing. "Seeding," when malicious actors strategically insert deceptions, like fake news, into a social media ecosystem, and "echoing" is when the audience disseminates disinformation argumentatively as their own opinions often by incorporating disinformation into a confrontational fantasy. Studies show four main methods of seeding disinformation:

 Selective censorship 
 Manipulation of search rankings
 Hacking and releasing
 Directly Sharing Disinformation

See also

 Active Measures Working Group
 Agitprop
 Black propaganda
 Censorship
 Chinese information operations and information warfare
 Counter Misinformation Team
 COVID-19 misinformation
 Deepfakes
 Demoralization (warfare)
 Denial and deception
 Disinformation in the 2022 Russian invasion of Ukraine
 Fake news
 False flag
 Fear, uncertainty and doubt
 Gaslighting
 Internet manipulation
 Knowledge falsification
 Kompromat
 Manufacturing Consent
 Military deception
 Post-truth politics
 Propaganda in the Soviet Union
 Sharp power
 Social engineering (political science)
 The Disinformation Project

Notes

References

Further reading

 
 
 
 O'Connor, Cailin, and James Owen Weatherall, "Why We Trust Lies: The most effective misinformation starts with seeds of truth", Scientific American, vol. 321, no. 3 (September 2019), pp. 54–61.

External links

 Disinformation – a learning resource from the British Library including an interactive movie and activities.
 MediaWell – an initiative of the nonprofit Social Science Research Council seeking to track and curate disinformation, misinformation, and fake news research.

 
Deception
Communication of falsehoods
Media manipulation
Propaganda techniques
Black propaganda
1920s neologisms
Russian words and phrases
Psychological warfare techniques
Intelligence operations by type